The 1984 Montreal Concordes finished the season in 3rd place in the East Division with a 6–9–1 record and lost in the East Semi-Final.

Preseason

Regular season

Standings

Schedule

Postseason

Awards and honours

References

External links
 Official Site

Montreal Alouettes seasons
1984 Canadian Football League season by team
1980s in Montreal
1984 in Quebec